Villimpenta is a comune (municipality) in the Province of Mantua in the Italian region Lombardy, located about  east of Milan and about  east of Mantua.

Villimpenta borders the municipalities of Castel d'Ario, Gazzo Veronese, Roncoferraro, Sorgà and Sustinente.

Origins of the Name 
The name may derive from Latin villapicta - which is a compound of villa (rural building surrounded by other houses and decorated) and the Latin adjective pictus, -a, -um (painted) through the form impincta.

History 
The town has remote origins and numerous archaeological findings which date back the settlement to the Neolithic and Bronze Age. The oldest mention dates back to 1047 and tells of a castellum in Villapicta owned by the Abbey of St Zeno of Verona, given by Emperor Henry III. Villimpenta was under the control of the Veronese house until 1243, when the Mantuans regained possession of the area, imprisoning the supporters of Ezzelino as well. During the 14th century, it passed under control of the Scaliger, the Visconti and on 23 January 1391, it definitively passed under the control of the Gonzaga with Francesco I Gonzaga, lord of Mantua, who purchased the area including the village and the ancient castle from Gian Galeazzo Visconti. The Gonzaga family ruled until 1708, the year of their fall. The village was plundered in 1618 and then 1796 by both French and Austrian troops.

Sights and Tourist Attractions 
 Scaliger Castle, 11th century
 Villa Gonzaga-Zani, 16th century, designed by Giulio Romano
 Parish church of San Michele Arcangelo, 18th century

Culture

Museums 
 Francioli Nuvolari Museum

Traditional events 
In the town the so-called "Festa del Risotto" (Risotto Festival) takes place, twinned with ‘Sagra de la Volìa Cazzata’ (Fair of the pressed olive) of Martano (Lecce).

References

External links
 

Cities and towns in Lombardy